Pallare is a comune (municipality) in the Province of Savona in the Italian region Liguria, located about  west of Genoa and about  west of Savona.

Pallare borders the following municipalities: Bormida, Carcare, Mallare, Millesimo, Osiglia, and Plodio.

References

Cities and towns in Liguria